Steven Gaydos is an American screenwriter, songwriter, and journalist.

Works
Steven Gaydos is a screenwriter known for writing American independent film director Monte Hellman's 2010 film Road to Nowhere, which was listed in the Sight & Sound and Film Comment "Best Films of 2010" lists, as well as over 100 other 'Best Films of 2010' lists. Nicolas Rapold of Film Comment wrote, "Without succumbing to any romance about the magic of motion pictures, Hellman imbues Road to Nowhere with a haunted yet hallowed quality." French philosopher Jacques Rancière updated his key work "Les Ecarts Du Cinema", in which he notes the way that Road to Nowhere creatively advances the themes of Alfred Hitchcock's classic thriller Vertigo.

Gaydos has co-authored several other screenplays, including the 1988 Venice Film Festival prize-winner Iguana and Silent Night Deadly Night III: Better Watch Out!, both directed by Monte Hellman. He frequently collaborates with Hellman, who has been honored with several published studies of his work, including the 2010 publication Sympathy for the Devil: The Films of Monte Hellman, as well as studies authored by film scholars Charles Tatum and Brad Stevens. In both works, Gaydos is widely quoted and his contributions to Hellman's oeuvre discussed. Gaydos' association with Hellman dates back to his work as a production associate on the 1974 action-drama Cockfighter. They have also been associated in several unproduced projects such as an adaptation of Jorge Semprún's historical novel, The Second Death of Ramon Mercader and Charles McCarry's spy thriller novel The Miernik Dossier.

As a screenwriter, Gaydos also developed and co-authored Dutch filmmaker Ate de Jong's adaptation of Simone de Beauvoir's novel All Men Are Mortal, and contributed to the screenplay for Dutch director Nouchka van Brakel’s, One Month Later.

In addition to his produced screenplays, Gaydos coauthored several screenplays with Edgar and Emmy Award-winning television writer-showrunner René Balcer, best known for the Law & Order television franchise. Gaydos's work with Balcer includes the unproduced screenplays Warheads (Hemdale) and Armed Response (Fox).

His unproduced solo works include current projects Bring Me the Head of Sam Peckinpah and The Man Who Was Not With It, based upon the novel by Herbert Gold.
In 2008, Gaydos received a special award for his contributions to film culture from the  Karlovy Vary International Film Festival.

Among Gaydos' music projects are several recorded works, including "More Than I Care To Remember" by Carl Hickman and "Chicken of the County", a popular parody record by Rod Hart based upon Kenny Rogers' hit "Coward of the County".

Gaydos’ song "Mystery Dawn" (co-authored with Mitch Moon and from the 2014 record "Rain in the Drought" by Sun and Moon) is featured in the 2014 Ate de Jong film Deadly Virtues: Love.Honour.Obey..

Gaydos is an entertainment journalist and the co-author of several books on the entertainment industry, including Movie Talk From The Front Lines (McFarland) and Cannes: 50 Years of Sun, Sex and Celluloid (Miramax). He has appeared regularly on American television and radio, international outlets such as the United Kingdom's BBC, and in publications around the world.

Gaydos was elevated to vice-president and Executive Editor of Variety in 2013.

Screenplays
 One Month Later (co-writer) 1987
 Iguana 1988 (co-writer)
 Silent Night Deadly Night III: Better Watch Out! 1989 (co-writer)
 All Men Are Mortal 1995 (co-writer)
 Road to Nowhere 2010 (screenwriter-producer)

Books
 Movie Talk From The Frontlines (McFarland) 1995 
 Variety Guide To Film Festivals (Perigee) 1998 
 Cannes: 50 Years of Sun, Sex & Celluloid (Miramax) 1997

Music
 "Rain in the Drought" (co-writer with Mitch Moon)
 "More Than I Care To Remember" (co-writer with Terrence Dwyer)
 "Chicken of the County" (co-writer with Terrence Dwyer)
 "Mystery Dawn" (from the film, Deadly Virtues: Love. Honour. Obey, co-writer with Mitch Moon)

References

External links
 

American male screenwriters
American male songwriters
American male journalists
Living people
Year of birth missing (living people)